Boris Bunjak (born November 17, 1954) is a Serbian football coach and a former player.

Playing career
Bunjak started his career in Sloga Kraljevo. He played with FK Radnički Kragujevac, FK Šumadija 1903, and FK Borac Čačak in the Yugoslav Second League.

Managerial career
Bunjak started in 1990 at Sloga and continued at Javor, Radnicki Nis, Uralan, Red Star Belgrade. In 2006, he started working in Al Nasr Salalah, and next club is Al Oruba Sur. On 11 July 2011, Bunjak was appointed as the manager of Saudi club Damac. He was sacked on 8 October 2011. On August 8, 2012, Tanzanian Premier League club Azam appointed Bunjak as the new head coach on a two-year deal. However, after just 2 months in charge of the club, he was fired for producing poor results.

On December 8, 2012, Myanmar National League club Yadanarbon appointed Bunjak as the new head coach.

On December 15, 2014, he won the Kuwait Crown Prince Cup with Al-Arabi SC.

In October 2015, Bunjak returned in his home club Sloga Kraljevo, together with his assistant Petar Đekić.
In August 2018, Lebanese Premier League, Nejmeh SC appointed bunjak as the new head coach.

In July 2019, Kuwait Premier League, Kazma SC appointed Bunjak as the new head coach.

References

External links
 Career summary at manarsports.com

1954 births
Living people
Sportspeople from Kraljevo
Association football midfielders
Yugoslav footballers
Serbian footballers
FK Sloga Kraljevo players
FK Voždovac players
FK Radnički 1923 players
FK Borac Čačak players
Serbian football managers
FK Javor Ivanjica managers
Kazma SC managers
FK Radnički Niš managers
FK Hajduk Kula managers
FC Elista managers
Damac FC managers
Azam F.C. managers
Qadsia SC managers
Al Jahra SC managers
Al-Arabi SC (Kuwait) managers
Kuwait national football team managers
Nejmeh SC managers
Russian Premier League managers
Saudi First Division League managers
Kuwait Premier League managers
Lebanese Premier League managers
Expatriate football managers in Kuwait
Expatriate football managers in Russia
Expatriate football managers in Saudi Arabia
Serbian expatriate sportspeople in Saudi Arabia
Serbian expatriate sportspeople in Kuwait
Serbian expatriate sportspeople in Myanmar
Serbian expatriate sportspeople in Oman
Serbia and Montenegro expatriate sportspeople in Russia
Serbian expatriate sportspeople in Lebanon
Expatriate football managers in Myanmar
Expatriate football managers in Lebanon
Expatriate football managers in Oman
Expatriate football managers in the United Arab Emirates
Serbian expatriate sportspeople in the United Arab Emirates
Expatriate football managers in Tanzania
Serbian expatriate sportspeople in Tanzania
Serbia and Montenegro football managers
Serbia and Montenegro expatriate football managers